Rosa or De Rosa may refer to:

Plants and animals 
Rosa (plant), the genus of roses
Rosa (sea otter), a sea otter that has become popular on the internet
Rosa (cow), a Spanish-born cow

People
Rosa (given name)
Rosa (surname)
Santa Rosa (female given name from Latin-a latinized variant of Rose)

Places
223 Rosa, an asteroid
Rosa, Alabama, a town, United States
Rosa, Germany, in Thuringia, Germany
Rösa, a village and former municipality in Saxony-Anhalt, Germany
Rosà a town in the province of Vicenza, Veneto, Italy
Monte Rosa, the second highest mountain in the Alps and Western Europe
Republic of South Africa, a southernmost country in Africa.

Film and television
Rosa (1986 film), a Hong Kong film released by Bo Ho Films
Rosa – A Horse Drama, a 1993-94 opera by Louis Andriessen on a libretto by Peter Greenaway
 "Rosa" (Doctor Who), an episode of the eleventh series of Doctor Who

Music
De Rosa (band), a band from Scotland
"Rosa", a song by Anitta and Prince Royce from the album Kisses, 2019
"Rosa", a song by Jacques Brel
"Rosa", a song by J Balvin from Colores, 2020

Vehicles
, a United States Navy patrol boat in commission from 1917 to 1918
Rosa (barge), a hotel barge
Mitsubishi ROSA, a bus built by Mitsubishi Fuso
De Rosa (bicycle company)

Technology
ROSA, a surgical robot
ROSA (operating system), a Linux distribution
RCA open-source application
Romanian Space Agency
Roll Out Solar Array

Other uses
Record of School Achievement, an Australian education qualification
Romanian Space Agency
Hurricane Rosa, several storms
ROSA (ISA), the feminist campaign of the International Socialist Alternative

See also

Roza (disambiguation)
Rosas (disambiguation)
Rosawa, a village in Rajasthan, India founded by the Rosa clan of Jat people
Sub rosa, Latin idiom for "in confidence"